KOXI-CD, virtual and UHF digital channel 20, is a low-powered, Class A Jewelry Television-affiliated television station licensed to Portland, Oregon, United States. The station is owned by HC2 Holdings.

Digital channels
The station's digital signal is multiplexed:

References

See also
KORK-CD
KORS-CD
KKEI-CD
KOXO-CD

Camas, Washington
OXI-CD
Television channels and stations established in 1991
Low-power television stations in the United States
1991 establishments in Washington (state)
YTA TV affiliates
Telemundo network affiliates
LX (TV network) affiliates
Buzzr affiliates
MeTV affiliates